Hamnet is a 2020 novel by Maggie O'Farrell. It is a fictional account of Shakespeare's son, Hamnet, who died at age 11 in 1596. 

In 2020, the book won the Women's Prize for Fiction and National Book Critics Circle Award for Fiction. The following year, it was named "Novel of the Year" at the Dalkey Literary Awards, was shortlisted for the Walter Scott Prize, and longlisted for the Andrew Carnegie Medal for Excellence in Fiction. It was described in Literary Review as "a rich story by any stretch of the imagination, and O’Farrell’s stretches much, much further than most of ours."

In 2023, a stage adaptation of the novel by Lolita Chakrabarti will premiere at the Royal Shakespeare Company in Stratford-upon-Avon re-opening the Swan Theatre since the COVID-19 pandemic.

Awards

References 

2020 British novels
Novels set in England
Novels set in the 16th century
Novels about William Shakespeare
Women's Prize for Fiction-winning works
National Book Critics Circle Award-winning works
Tinder Press books